Billy Wilder (born Samuel Wilder; June 22, 1906 – March 27, 2002) was an Austrian-American filmmaker. His career in Hollywood spanned five decades, and he is regarded as one of the most brilliant and versatile filmmakers of Classic Hollywood cinema. He was nominated for the Academy Award for Best Director eight times, winning twice, and for a screenplay Academy Award 13 times, winning three times.

Wilder became a screenwriter while living in Berlin. The rise of the Nazi Party and antisemitism in Germany saw him move to Paris. He then moved to Hollywood in 1933, and had a major hit when he, Charles Brackett and Walter Reisch wrote the screenplay for the Academy Award-nominated film Ninotchka (1939). Wilder established his directorial reputation and received his first nomination for the Academy Award for Best Director with the film noir Double Indemnity (1944), based on the novel by James M Cain with a screenplay by Wilder and Raymond Chandler. Wilder won the Best Director and Best Screenplay Academy Awards for the film adaptation of the novel The Lost Weekend (1945), which also won the Academy Award for Best Picture.

In the 1950s, Wilder directed and co-wrote a string of critically acclaimed films, including the Hollywood drama Sunset Boulevard (1950), for which he won his second screenplay Academy Award; Ace in the Hole (1951), Stalag 17 (1953) and Sabrina (1954). Wilder directed and co-wrote three films in 1957, including The Spirit of St. Louis, Love in the Afternoon and Witness for the Prosecution. Wilder directed Marilyn Monroe in two films, The Seven Year Itch (1955) and Some Like It Hot (1959). In 1960, Wilder co-wrote, directed and produced the critically acclaimed film The Apartment. It won Wilder Academy Awards for Best Picture, Best Director and Best Original Screenplay. Beginning with Some Like It Hot and The Apartment, he made seven films with Jack Lemmon, four of which co-starred Walter Matthau; the threesome's first collaboration was The Fortune Cookie (1966). Other notable films Wilder directed include One, Two, Three (1961), Irma la Douce (1963),  Kiss Me, Stupid (1964) and Avanti! (1972). Wilder directed fourteen actors in Oscar-nominated performances.

Wilder received various honors over his distinguished career between the late 1980s and 1990s. He received the British Academy Film Award Fellowship Award, the Directors Guild of America's Lifetime Achievement Award, the Laurel Award for Screenwriting Achievement, and the Producers Guild of America's Lifetime Achievement Award. Double Indemnity, Sunset Boulevard, Some Like It Hot, and The Apartment are included in the AFI's greatest American films of all time. , seven of his films are preserved in the United States National Film Registry of the Library of Congress as being "culturally, historically or aesthetically significant". Anthony Lane writes that Double Indemnity, The Seven Year Itch, Sunset Boulevard and The Apartment are "part of the lexicon of moviegoing" and that Some Like It Hot is a "national treasure." Roger Ebert asked, "Of all the great directors of Hollywood's golden age, has anybody made more films that are as fresh and entertaining to this day as Billy Wilder's?...And who else can field three contenders among the greatest closing lines of all time?", citing the closing lines of Sunset Boulevard, Some Like it Hot, and The Apartment. Wilder's epitaph, a paraphrase of the last line of Some Like It Hot, is "I'm a writer but then nobody's perfect."

Early life
Samuel Wilder ( Shmuel Vildr) was born on June 22, 1906 to a family of Polish Jews in Sucha Beskidzka, a small town which, at that time, belonged to the Austro-Hungarian Empire. Years later in Hollywood, he would describe it as being "Half an hour from Vienna. By telegraph." His parents were Eugenia (née Dittler) and Max Wilder. He was nicknamed "Billie" by his mother (he changed this to "Billy" after arriving in America). Eugenia Wilder has described her young son as a "rambunctious kid" and has been inspired by the Buffalo Bill's Wild West Shows that she saw while living briefly in New York.

Wilder's elder brother, W. Lee Wilder, was also a filmmaker. His parents had a successful and well-known cake shop in Sucha's train station that flourished into a chain of railroad cafes. Eugenia and Max Wilder did not persuade their son to join the family business. Furthermore, Max Wilder moved to Kraków to manage a hotel before moving to Vienna. Max died when Billy was 22 years old. After the family moved to Vienna, Wilder became a journalist, instead of attending the University of Vienna. In 1926, jazz band leader Paul Whiteman was on tour in Vienna when he met and was interviewed by Wilder, a fan of Whiteman's band. Whiteman liked young Wilder enough that he took him with the band to Berlin, where Wilder was able to make more connections in the entertainment field. 

Before achieving success as a writer, he was a taxi dancer in Berlin.

Career

Early work

After writing crime and sports stories as a stringer for local newspapers, he was eventually offered a regular job at a Berlin tabloid. Developing an interest in film, he began working as a screenwriter. From 1929 to 1933 he produced twelve German films. He collaborated with several other novices (Fred Zinnemann and Robert Siodmak) on the 1930 film People on Sunday. Eschewing the German Expressionist styles of F. W. Murnau and Fritz Lang, People on Sunday was considered as a groundbreaking example of the Neue Sachlichkeit or New Objectivity movement in German cinema. Furthermore, this genre of Strassenfilm ("street film") paved way to the birth of Italian neorealism and the French New Wave. He wrote the screenplay for the 1931 film adaptation of a novel by Erich Kästner, Emil and the Detectives, also screenplays for the comedy The Man in Search of His Murderer (1931), the operetta Her Grace Commands (1931) and the comedy A Blonde Dream (1932), all of them produced in the Babelsberg Studios in Potsdam near Berlin. In 1932 Wilder collaborated with the writer and journalist Felix Salten on the screenplay for "Scampolo". After Adolf Hitler's rise to power, Wilder went to Paris, where he made his directorial debut film Mauvaise Graine (1934). He relocated to Hollywood prior to its release. Wilder's mother, grandmother and stepfather were all victims of the Holocaust. For decades it was assumed that it happened at Auschwitz Concentration Camp, but while researching Polish and Israeli archives, his Austrian biographer Andreas Hutter discovered in 2011 that they were murdered in different locations: his mother, Eugenia "Gitla" Siedlisker, in 1943 at Plaszow; his stepfather, Bernard "Berl" Siedlisker, in 1942 at Belzec; and his grandmother, Balbina Baldinger, died in 1943 in the ghetto in Nowy Targ.

After arriving in Hollywood in 1933, Wilder continued working as a screenwriter. He became a naturalized citizen of the United States in 1939, having spent time in Mexico waiting for the government after his six-month card expired in 1934, an episode reflected in his 1941 Hold Back the Dawn. Wilder's first significant success was Ninotchka, a collaboration with fellow German immigrant Ernst Lubitsch. The romantic comedy starred Greta Garbo (generally known as a tragic heroine in film melodramas), and was popularly and critically acclaimed. With the byline "Garbo Laughs!", it also took Garbo's career in a new direction. The film marked Wilder's first Academy Award nomination, which he shared with co-writer Charles Brackett (although their collaboration on Bluebeard's Eighth Wife and Midnight had been well received). Wilder co-wrote many of his films with Brackett from 1938 to 1950. Brackett described their collaboration process: "The thing to do was suggest an idea, have it torn apart and despised. In a few days it would be apt to turn up, slightly changed, as Wilder's idea. Once I got adjusted to that way of working, our lives were simpler." "Wilder followed Ninotchka with a series of box office hits in 1942, including Hold Back the Dawn, Ball of Fire, and his directorial debut film The Major and the Minor.

1940s 

His third film as director, the film noir Double Indemnity, starring Fred MacMurray, Barbara Stanwyck and Edward G. Robinson, was a major hit. It was nominated for seven Academy Awards including Best Picture, Director, Screenplay and Actress; Wilder co-wrote it with Raymond Chandler. The film not only set conventions for the noir genre (such as "venetian blind" lighting and voice-over narration), but is a landmark in the battle against Hollywood censorship. Based on James M. Cain's novel, it featured two love triangles and a murder plotted for insurance money. While the book was popular with the reading public, it had been considered unfilmable under the Hays Code because adultery was central to the plot.

In 1945, the Psychological Warfare Department of the United States Department of War produced an American documentary film directed by Wilder. The film known as Death Mills, or Die Todesmühlen, was intended for German audiences to educate them about the atrocities committed by the Nazi regime. For the German version, Die Todesmühlen, Hanuš Burger is credited as the writer and director, while Wilder supervised the editing. Wilder is credited with the English-language version.

Two years later, Wilder adapted from Charles R. Jackson's novel The Lost Weekend into a film of the same name. It was the first major American film with a serious examination of alcoholism, another difficult theme under the Production Code. It follows an alcoholic writer (Ray Milland) opposing the protestations of his girlfriend (Jane Wyman). The film earned critical acclaim, after it premiered at the Cannes Film Festival and competed in the main competition, where it received the Festival's top prize, the Palme d'Or, and four Academy Awards including for Best Picture. Wilder earned the Oscars for Best Director and Best Screenplay and Milland won Best Actor. The film remained to be one of the three films, winning both the Academy Award for Best Picture and the Cannes Film Festival's Palme d' Or, alongside Marty and Parasite.

1950s 

In 1950, Wilder co-wrote and directed the cynical noir comedy film Sunset Boulevard. It follows a reclusive silent film actress (Gloria Swanson), who dreams of a comeback with delusions of her greatness from a bygone era. She accompanies an aspiring screenwriter (William Holden), who becomes her gigolo partner. This critically acclaimed film was the final film Wilder collaborated with Brackett. The film was nominated for eleven Academy Awards; together Wilder and Brackett won the Academy Award for Best Original Screenplay.

In 1951, Wilder directed Ace in the Hole (a.k.a. The Big Carnival) starring Kirk Douglas in a tale of media exploitation of a caving accident. The idea had been pitched over the phone to Wilder's secretary by Victor Desny. Desny sued Wilder for breach of an implied contract in the California copyright case Wilder v Desny, ultimately receiving a settlement of $14,350. Although a critical and commercial failure at the time, its reputation has grown over the years. Wilder then directed three adaptations of Broadway plays, war drama Stalag 17, for which William Holden won the Best Actor Academy Award, romantic comedy Sabrina, for which Audrey Hepburn was nominated for Best Actress, and romantic comedy The Seven Year Itch, which features the iconic image of Marilyn Monroe standing on a subway grate as her white dress is blown upwards by a passing train. Wilder was nominated for the Academy Award for Best Director for the first two films and shared a nomination for Best Screenplay for the second. He was interested in doing a film with one of the classic slapstick comedy acts of the Hollywood Golden Age. He first considered, and rejected, a project to star Laurel and Hardy. He held discussions with Groucho Marx concerning a new Marx Brothers comedy, tentatively titled A Day at the U.N. The project was abandoned after Chico Marx died in 1961.

In 1957, three films Wilder directed were released: biopic The Spirit of St. Louis, starring James Stewart as Charles Lindbergh, romantic comedy Love In The Afternoon--Wilder's first screenplay with I. A. L. Diamond, who'd become his regular partner--featuring Gary Cooper, Maurice Chevalier and Audrey Hepburn, and courtroom drama Witness for the Prosecution, featuring Tyrone Power, Marlene Dietrich and Charles Laughton.  Wilder received an Academy Award nomination for Best Director for the last film.

In 1959, Wilder reunited with Monroe in the United Artists released Prohibition-era farce film Some Like It Hot. It was released without however, a Production Code seal of approval, withheld due to the film's unabashed sexual comedy, including a central cross-dressing theme. Jack Lemmon and Tony Curtis played musicians disguised as women to escape pursuit by a Chicago gang. Curtis's character courts a singer (Monroe), while Lemmon is wooed by Joe E. Brownsetting up the film's final joke in which Lemmon reveals that his character is a man and Brown blandly replies "Well, nobody's perfect". A box office success, the film was lightly regarded by film critics during its original release, although it did receive six Academy Award nominations, including for Best Director and Best Screenplay. But its critical reputation grew prodigiously; in 2000, the American Film Institute selected it as the best American comedy ever made.  In 2012, the British Film Institute decennial Sight and Sound poll of the world's film critics rated it as the 43rd best movie ever made, and the second-highest-ranking comedy.

1960s 

In 1960, Wilder directed the comedy romance film The Apartment. It follows an insurance clerk (Lemmon), who allows his coworkers to use his apartment to conduct extramarital affairs until he meets an elevator woman (Shirley MacLaine). The film was a critical success with The New York Times film critic Bosley Crowther, who called the film "gleeful, tender, and even sentimental" and Wilder's direction "ingenious". The film received ten Academy Awards nominations and won five awards, including three for Wilder: Best Picture, Best Director and Best Screenplay.

Wilder directed the Cold War political farce film One, Two, Three (1961), starring James Cagney, which won critical praise with Variety writing, "Billy Wilder's One, Two, Three is a fast-paced, high-pitched, hard-hitting, lighthearted farce crammed with topical gags and spiced with satirical overtones. Story is so furiously quick-witted that some of its wit gets snarled and smothered in overlap." It was followed by the romantic comedy Irma la Douce (1963) starring Lemmon and MacLaine. The film was the fifth highest-grossing film of the year. Wilder received a Writers Guild of America Award nomination for his screenplay. Wilder then wrote and directed the sex comedy film Kiss Me, Stupid starring Dean Martin, Kim Novak, and Ray Walston, who was a last minute replacement for ailing Peter Sellers. The film was criticized by some critics for vulgarity, with Bosley Crowther blaming the film for giving American movies the reputation of "deliberate and degenerate corruptors of public taste and morals". A. H. Weiler of the New York Times called the film "pitifully unfunny". Wilder gained his final Academy Award nomination and a Writers Guild of America Award nomination for the screenplay of The Fortune Cookie. It was the first film pairing Jack Lemmon with Walter Matthau. (The film was titled Meet Whiplash Willie in the United Kingdom.) In 1970, he directed The Private Life of Sherlock Holmes, which was intended as a major roadshow theatrical release, but to Wilder's dismay was heavily cut by the studio.

Final films 
He directed the comedy film Avanti!, which follows a businessman (Lemmon) attempting to retrieve the body of his deceased father from Italy. Wilder received two Golden Globe Award nominations for Best Director and Best Screenplay, and a Writers Guild of America Award nomination. Wilder directed The Front Page based on the Broadway play of the same name. It was a significant financial success with low budget. His final films, Fedora and Buddy Buddy, failed to impress critics or the public, although Fedora has since been re-evaluated and is now considered favorably. Wilder had hoped to make Thomas Keneally's Schindler's Ark as his final film, saying "I wanted to do it as a kind of memorial to my mother and my grandmother and my stepfather," who had all been murdered in the Holocaust. He praised Steven Spielberg's adaptation, Schindler's List. To those who denied the Holocaust, Wilder wrote in a German newspaper, "If the concentration camps and the gas chambers were all imaginary, then please tell me—where is my mother?"

Directorial style
Wilder's directorial choices reflected his belief in the primacy of writing. He avoided, especially in the second half of his career, the exuberant cinematography of Alfred Hitchcock and Orson Welles because, in Wilder's opinion, shots that called attention to themselves would distract the audience from the story. Wilder's films have tight plotting and memorable dialogue. Despite his conservative directorial style, his subject matter often pushed the boundaries of mainstream entertainment. Once a subject was chosen, he would begin to visualize in terms of specific artists. His belief was that no matter how talented the actor, none were without limitations and the result would be better if you bent the script to their personality rather than force a performance beyond their limitations. Wilder was skilled at working with actors, coaxing silent era legends Gloria Swanson and Erich von Stroheim out of retirement for roles in Sunset Boulevard. Regarding Wilder's more comedic films, Roger Ebert wrote: "he took the characters seriously, or at least as seriously as the material allowed, and got a lot of the laughs by playing scenes straight."

For Stalag 17, Wilder squeezed an Oscar-winning performance out of a reluctant William Holden (Holden had wanted to make his character more likable; Wilder refused). At a casting meeting, Wilder reportedly said, "I'm tired of clichéd typecasting—the same people in every film." An example of this is Wilder's casting of Fred MacMurray in Double Indemnity and The Apartment. MacMurray had become Hollywood's highest-paid actor portraying a decent, thoughtful character in light comedies, melodramas, and musicals; Wilder cast him as a womanizing schemer. Humphrey Bogart shed his tough-guy image to give one of his warmest performances in Sabrina. James Cagney, not usually known for comedy, was memorable in a high-octane comic role for Wilder's One, Two, Three. Wilder coaxed a very effective performance out of Monroe in Some Like It Hot.

In total, he directed fourteen different actors in Oscar-nominated performances: Barbara Stanwyck in Double Indemnity, Ray Milland in The Lost Weekend, William Holden in Sunset Boulevard and Stalag 17, Gloria Swanson, Erich von Stroheim and Nancy Olson in Sunset Boulevard, Robert Strauss in Stalag 17, Audrey Hepburn in Sabrina, Charles Laughton in Witness for the Prosecution, Elsa Lanchester in Witness for the Prosecution, Jack Lemmon in Some Like It Hot and The Apartment, Jack Kruschen in The Apartment, Shirley MacLaine in The Apartment and Irma la Douce and Walter Matthau in The Fortune Cookie.  Wilder mentioned Lemmon, and was the first director to pair him and Matthau in The Fortune Cookie. Wilder and Lemmon worked on seven films. 

Wilder opposed the House Un-American Activities Committee (HUAC). He co-created the “Committee for the First Amendment”, of 500 Hollywood personalities and stars to “support those professionals called upon to testify before the HUAC who had classified themselves as hostile with regard to the interrogations and the interrogators”. Some anti-Communists wanted those in the cinema industry to take oaths of allegiance. The Screen Directors Guild had a vote by show of hands. Only John Huston and Wilder opposed. Huston said, "I am sure it was one of the bravest things that Billy, as a naturalized German, had ever done. There were 150 to 200 directors at this meeting, and here Billy and I sat alone with our hands raised in protest against the loyalty oath."

Wilder was not affected by the Hollywood blacklist. Of the blacklisted 'Hollywood Ten' he said, "Of the ten, two had talent, and the rest were just unfriendly." In general, Wilder disliked formula and genre films. Wilder reveled in poking fun at those who took politics too seriously. In Ball of Fire, his burlesque queen 'Sugarpuss' points at her sore throat and complains "Pink? It's as red as the Daily Worker and just as sore." Later, she gives the overbearing and unsmiling housemaid the name "Franco".

Retirement

Wilder received the American Film Institute Life Achievement Award in 1986. He received the Irving G. Thalberg Memorial Award in 1988, the Kennedy Center Honors in 1990 and the National Medal of Arts in 1993. He has a star on the Hollywood Walk of Fame. Wilder became well known for owning one of the finest and most extensive art collections in Hollywood, mainly collecting modern art. As he described it in the mid-80s, "It's a sickness. I don't know how to stop myself. Call it bulimia if you want – or curiosity or passion. I have some Impressionists, some Picassos from every period, some mobiles by Calder. I also collect tiny Japanese trees, glass paperweights, and Chinese vases. Name an object and I collect it." Wilder's artistic ambitions led him to create a series of works of his own. By the early '90s, Wilder had amassed many plastic-artistic constructions, many of which were made in collaboration with artist Bruce Houston. In 1993, art dealer Louis Stern, a longtime friend, helped organize an exhibition of Wilder's work at his Beverly Hills gallery. The exhibition was titled Billy Wilder's Marché aux Puces and the Variations on the Theme of Queen Nefertete segment was notably popular. This series featured busts of the Egyptian queen wrapped à la Christo, or splattered à la Jackson Pollock, or sporting a Campbell's soup can in homage to Andy Warhol.

Personal life and death
Wilder married Judith Coppicus on December 22, 1936. The couple had twins, Victoria and Vincent (born 1939), but Vincent died shortly after birth. They divorced in 1946. Wilder met Audrey Young while filming The Lost Weekend. They were married on June 30, 1949.

Wilder died of pneumonia on March 27, 2002. He was buried at Pierce Brothers Westwood Village Memorial Park and Mortuary. A French newspaper, Le Monde, titled the front-page obituary: “Billy Wilder is dead. Nobody is perfect”, a reference to the last line of Some Like It Hot.

Legacy

"Don't be boring". — Billy Wilder

Wilder holds a significant place in the history of Hollywood censorship for expanding the range of acceptable subject matter. He is responsible for two of film noir's most definitive films, Double Indemnity and Sunset Boulevard. Along with Woody Allen and the Marx Brothers, he leads the list of films on the American Film Institute's list of 100 funniest American films with five films written as well as having the honor of holding the top spot on it with Some Like it Hot. Also on the list are The Apartment and The Seven Year Itch which he directed, and Ball of Fire and Ninotchka which he co-wrote. The American Film Institute has ranked four of Wilder's films among their top 100 American films of the 20th century: Sunset Boulevard (no. 12), Some Like It Hot (no. 14), Double Indemnity (no. 38) and The Apartment (no. 93). For the tenth anniversary edition of their list, the AFI moved Sunset Boulevard to No. 16, Some Like it Hot to No. 22, Double Indemnity to No. 29 and The Apartment to No. 80. Wilder was ranked 6th in director's poll on Sight & Sound's 2002 list of The Greatest Directors of All Time. In 1996, Entertainment Weekly ranked Wilder at No. 24 in its "50 Greatest Directors" list. Wilder was ranked at No. 19 on Empire magazine's "Top 40 Greatest Directors of All-Time" list in 2005. In 2007, Total Film magazine ranked Wilder at No. 13 on its "100 Greatest Film Directors Ever" list. Wilder was voted at No. 4 on the "Greatest Directors of 20th Century" poll conducted by Japanese film magazine Kinema Junpo.

Spanish filmmaker Fernando Trueba said in his acceptance speech when Belle Époque won the 1993 Academy Award for Best Foreign Language Film: "I would like to believe in God in order to thank him. But I just believe in Billy Wilder... so thank you, Mr. Wilder." According to Trueba, Wilder called him the day after and told him: "Fernando, it's God." French filmmaker Michel Hazanavicius also thanked Billy Wilder in the 2012 Best Picture Oscar acceptance speech for The Artist by saying "I would like to thank the following three people, I would like to thank Billy Wilder, I would like to thank Billy Wilder, and I would like to thank Billy Wilder." Wilder's 12 Academy Award nominations for screenwriting were a record until 1997 when Woody Allen received a 13th nomination for Deconstructing Harry. In 2017, Vulture.com named Wilder the greatest screenwriter of all time.

Filmography

Awards and honors

Wilder received twenty-one nominations at the Academy Awards, winning six. In total, he received thirteen nominations for his screenwriting, and eight for his direction. He won both the Academy Award for Best Director and the Academy Award for Best Original Screenplay for both The Lost Weekend (1945) and The Apartment (1960). The former was awarded the Grand Prix du Festival International du Film at the Cannes Film Festival, and the latter also won him the BAFTA Award for Best Film. Wilder garnered eight Directors Guild of America Award nominations, with the sole win for his work on The Apartment. He received seven nominations at the Golden Globe Awards, winning Best Director for The Lost Weekend and Sunset Boulevard (1950). He won seven Writers Guild of America Awards including two Laurel Awards for Screenwriting Achievement. He garnered a number of lifetime achievement awards including the Irving G. Thalberg Memorial Award, the BAFTA Fellowship, the David O. Selznick Achievement Award in Theatrical Motion Pictures, and the Honorary Golden Bear from the Berlin International Film Festival.

See also 
 List of film director and actor collaborations
 List of refugees

References

Further reading

 Armstrong, Richard, Billy Wilder, American Film Realist (McFarland & Company, Inc.: 2000)
 Dan Auiler, Some Like it Hot (Taschen, 2001)
 
 Chandler, Charlotte, Nobody's Perfect. Billy Wilder. A Personal Biography (New York: Schuster & Schuster, 2002)
 Crowe, Cameron, Conversations with Wilder (New York: Knopf, 2001)
 Guilbert, Georges-Claude, Literary Readings of Billy Wilder (Newcastle: Cambridge Scholars Publishing, 2007)
 Gyurko, Lanin A., The Shattered Screen. Myth and Demythification in the Art of Carlos Fuentes and Billy Wilder (New Orleans: University Press of the South, 2009)
 Hermsdorf, Daniel, Billy Wilder. Filme – Motive – Kontroverses (Bochum: Paragon-Verlag, 2006)
 
 Hopp, Glenn, Billy Wilder (Pocket Essentials: 2001)
 Hopp, Glenn / Duncan, Paul, Billy Wilder (Köln / New York: Taschen, 2003)
 Horton, Robert, Billy Wilder Interviews (University Press of Mississippi, 2001)
 Hutter, Andreas / Kamolz, Klaus, Billie Wilder. Eine europäische Karriere (Vienna, Cologne, Weimar: Boehlau, 1998)
 Jacobs, Jérôme, Billy Wilder (Paris: Rivages Cinéma, 2006)
 Hellmuth Karasek, Billy Wilder, eine Nahaufnahme (Heyne, 2002)
 Lally, Kevin, Wilder Times: The Life of Billy Wilder (Henry Holt & Co: 1st ed edition, May 1996)
 Phillips, Gene D., Some Like It Wilder (The University Press of Kentucky: 2010)
 Sikov, Ed, On Sunset Boulevard. The Life and Times of Billy Wilder (New York: Hyperion, 1999)
 Neil Sinyard & Adrian Turner, "Journey Down Sunset Boulevard" (BCW, Isle of Wight, UK, 1979)
 Tom Wood, The Bright Side of Billy Wilder, Primarily (New York: Doubleday & Company, Inc, 1969)
 Zolotow, Maurice, Billy Wilder in Hollywood (Pompton Plains: Limelight Editions, 2004)
 Billy Wilder, The Art of Screenwriting No. 1; Interviewed by James Linville Paris Review 1996
 Billy Wilder: A Bibliography of Materials (via UC Berkeley Library)

External links

 
 
 
 Billy Wilder at American Masters
 Billy Wilder at Österreichische Mediathek archive (in German)

1906 births
2002 deaths
American film directors
American film producers
American male journalists
20th-century American journalists
American people of Polish-Jewish descent
Jewish American art collectors
American male screenwriters
Austrian emigrants to the United States
Austrian film directors
Austrian film producers
Austrian Jews
Austrian journalists
Austrian refugees
Austrian screenwriters
BAFTA fellows
Best Adapted Screenplay Academy Award winners
Best Directing Academy Award winners
Best Director Golden Globe winners
Best Original Screenplay Academy Award winners
Comedy film directors
Filmmakers who won the Best Film BAFTA Award
Producers who won the Best Picture Academy Award
Burials at Westwood Village Memorial Park Cemetery
Deaths from cancer in California
David di Donatello winners
Honorary Golden Bear recipients
Directors Guild of America Award winners
English-language film directors
European Film Awards winners (people)
German-language film directors
Deaths from pneumonia in California
Jewish emigrants from Nazi Germany to the United States
Jews from Galicia (Eastern Europe)
Kennedy Center honorees
Knights Commander of the Order of Merit of the Federal Republic of Germany
People from Innere Stadt
People from Leopoldstadt
People from Sucha Beskidzka
United States National Medal of Arts recipients
Directors of Palme d'Or winners
AFI Life Achievement Award recipients
20th-century American male writers
20th-century American screenwriters